The 1981 Lynda Carter Maybelline Classic was a women's tennis tournament played on outdoor hard courts at the Deer Creek Racquet Club in Deerfield Beach, Florida in the United States that was part of the Toyota Series of the 1981 Avon Championships World Championship Series. It was the second edition of the tournament and was held from October 12 through October 18, 1981. First-seeded Chris Evert-Lloyd won her second consecutive singles title at the event and earned $22,000 first-prize money.

Finals

Singles
 Chris Evert-Lloyd defeated  Andrea Jaeger 4–6, 6–3, 6–0
 It was Evert-Lloyd's 8th singles title of the year and the 109th of her career.

Doubles
 Mary-Lou Daniels /  Wendy White defeated  Pam Shriver /  Paula Smith 6–1, 3–6, 7–5
 It was Daniels's and White's first doubles title of their careers.

Prize money

References

External links
 ITF tournament edition details

Lynda Carter Maybelline Classic
Maybelline Classic
Lynda Carter Maybelline Classic
Lynda Carter Maybelline Classic
Lynda Carter Maybelline Classic